The Đông Yên Châu inscription is an Old Cham inscription written in an Old Southern Brahmic script, found in 1936 at Đông Yên Châu, northwest of Trà Kiệu, formerly was the old Champa capital known as Simhapura, Central Vietnam. The inscription was written in prose, is the oldest document of Cham (and indeed of any Austronesian language), and testifies the existence of indigenous beliefs among the ancient Cham people of Champa kingdom. Though not itself dated, the phrasing of the inscription is identical with those of dated Sanskrit inscriptions of Bhadravarman I of the second dynasty, who ruled Champa at the end of the 4th century CE. It contains an imprecatory formula ordering respect for the "naga of the king", undoubtedly a reference to the protective divinity of a spring or well. This vernacular text shows that in the 4th century, the land which now constitutes modern day central Vietnam was inhabited by an Austronesian-speaking population. The evidence, both monumental and palaeographic, also suggests that Hinduism was the predominant religious system.

The fact that the language in the inscription shares some basic grammar and vocabulary with Malay has led some scholars to argue that the inscription contains the oldest specimen of Malay words in the form of Old Malay, older by three centuries than the earliest Srivijayan inscriptions from southeastern Sumatra. However, most scholars consider it established that this inscription was written in Old Cham instead. The shared basic grammar and vocabulary comes as no surprise, since Chamic and Malayic languages are closely related; both are the two subgroups of a Malayic–Chamic group within the Malayo-Polynesian branch of the Austronesian family.

Text
The language of the inscription is not far from modern Cham or Malay in its grammar and vocabulary. The similarities to modern Malay and Cham grammar are evident in the yang and ya relative markers, both found in Cham, in the dengan ("with") and di (locative marker), in the syntax of the equative sentence Ni yang naga punya putauv means "This that serpent possessed by the king", in the use of punya as a genitive marker, and so on. Indian influence is evident in the Sanskrit terms Siddham, a frequently used invocation of fortune; nāga "serpent, dragon"; svarggah "heaven", paribhū "to insult", naraka "hell", and kulo "family". The text of the inscription itself, associated with a well near Indrapura, is short but linguistically revealing:

Transliteration
Siddham! Ni yang nāga punya putauv.
Ya urāng sepuy di ko, kurun ko jemā labuh nari svarggah.
Ya urāng paribhū di ko, kurun saribu thun davam di naraka, dengan tijuh kulo ko.

Word-for-word English equivalent
fortune! this (that) serpent possess king.
(O) person respect (in) him, for him jewels fall from heaven.
(O) person insult (in) him, for one-thousand year remain (in) hell, with seven family he.

English translation
Fortune! this is the divine serpent of the king.
Whoever respects him, for him jewels fall from heaven.
Whoever insults him, he will remain for a thousand years in hell, with seven generations of his family.

Malay translation
Sejahtera! Inilah naga suci kepunyaan Raja.
Orang yang menghormatinya, turun kepadanya permata dari syurga.
Orang yang menghinanya, akan seribu tahun diam di neraka, dengan tujuh keturunan keluarganya.

Western Cham translation
Nabuwah! Ni kung nāga milik patao.
Hây urāng adab tuei nyu, ka pak nyu mâh priak yeh hu plêk mâng syurga mai.
Hâi urāng papndik harakat pak nyu, ka ye saribau thun tram di naraka, hong tajuh mangawom nyu.

Vietnamese translation
Thời vận! Đây là xà thần của người.
Ai tôn trọng người, với ngươi vàng bạc rơi từ thiên đường.
Ai sỉ nhục người, kẻ đó sẽ ở địa ngục nghìn năm, với bảy đời gia đình hắn.

See also 
List of languages by first written accounts

References

Bibliography

Cham
Austronesian inscriptions
4th-century inscriptions
Earliest known manuscripts by language
History of Vietnam
1st millennium in Vietnam